Smart tag may refer to:

 SMART tag™, a student transportation system
 Smart Tag, a Virginia toll collection system
 SmartTAG, a Malaysian toll collection system
 Smart tag (Microsoft), a search feature in Microsoft software
 Smart label, a type of radio-frequency identification (RFID) transponder
 Smart Tag, a component of the Wheels of Zeus GPS-tracking system
 Samsung Galaxy SmartTag, a key finder